Matija Pecotić (born 3 July 1989) is a Croatian tennis player.

Pecotić has a career high ATP singles ranking of 206 achieved on 23 November 2015. He also has a career high ATP doubles ranking of 485 achieved on 16 November 2015. Pecotić has won 12 ITF titles, 10 singles and 2 doubles.

Pecotic played #1 for Princeton University, and became the first player from Princeton since 1984 to reach the semi-finals of the All-American tournament. As a result of his historic run, Pecotic reached a ranking of No.2 in the nation.

Tennis career

Pecotic began playing on the pro tour in January 2014.

Pecotić represented Team Croatia and the 2023 United Cup where they beat Argentina (5–0) and France (3–2)

Personal life
Pecotić was born in Belgrade, Yugoslavia and moved to Malta at the age of 3, where he picked up tennis. 

During his time off due to an injury suffered in 2016, Pecotić applied and was accepted to Harvard Business School, which he attended from 2017 to 2019, earning an MBA at the completion of his studies.

In 2021, Pecotić began working for a private equity/real estate development firm in West Palm Beach, Florida, but continued to play tournaments that were close by.

College career

He played college tennis at Princeton University, where he became the most winning player in program history. He was also the captain of the tennis team, Princeton’s first All-American since 1984, and the first-ever and only three-time Ivy League Player of the Year.

Professional career

2014–16
In January 2014, Pecotic joined the professional tour. 

In less than 24 months, he climbed to world No. 206 but was sidelined by an injury that kept him out for most of 2016.

2019
Pecotić returned to the ATP Tour in August 2019, and put up a 46–8 W/L Record to return to the top 300, but did not play for most of 2021 due to the COVID-19 pandemic.

2022
In 2022, he only played three events, beating Stefano Travaglia 6–0 6–1 in the qualifications of the ATP event in Umag, Croatia as a wildcard.

2023: ATP debut and first ATP win
In 2023, he debuted for the Croatia national team at the 2023 United Cup in Perth, Australia but did not play any singles matches. He played one match in doubles with Petra Marčinko. Team Croatia beat Argentina (5–0) and France (3–2) but lost to Greece.

At 33, ranked No. 784 he qualified for his first main draw at the 2023 Delray Beach Open as an alternate defeating two Americans Stefan Kozlov and Tennys Sandgren. As a result he moved more than a 100 positions in the rankings. He defeated a third American, former top-10 player Jack Sock in the first round, his first ATP win ever. In the round of 16 he lost to American Marcos Giron.  He moved another 100 positions into the top 600.

Singles performance timeline
Current through the 2023 Delray Beach Open.

References

External links

1989 births
Living people
Croatian male tennis players
Sportspeople from Belgrade
Princeton Tigers men's tennis players
Harvard Business School alumni